"After the Love Has Gone" is a single by Earth, Wind & Fire released in 1979 on ARC/Columbia Records. The song reached No. 2 on both the US Billboard Hot 100, behind The Knack's "My Sharona" and the US Billboard Hot R&B Singles chart, No. 4 on the UK Pop Singles chart and No. 3 on the US Billboard Adult Contemporary Songs chart. "After the Love Has Gone" has also been certified Gold in the US by the RIAA and Silver in the UK by the BPI.

Background
"After the Love Has Gone" was produced by Maurice White and written by David Foster, Jay Graydon, and  Bill Champlin. The single's B-side was "Rock That." Both songs came from Earth, Wind & Fire's 1979 studio album I Am.

The song's origin dates back to when David Foster was working on an album for Motown Records singer Jaye P. Morgan. The album was released in Japan and never took off in the United States. Foster later went to Motown to let the executives hear some of the material. Foster was in the middle of a song and ad-libbed the chorus to "After The Love Has Gone", as he had forgotten the words. Foster and Jay Graydon  then asked Bill Champlin to write lyrics to the music after Graydon had come up with an idea for the verse. At the time, Foster was producing Champlin's 1978 solo debut Single for Full Moon/Epic Records and was working with Earth, Wind & Fire around the time they were recording their album I Am. Foster then showed Maurice White the song, which White loved and wanted to record. Foster and Graydon later told Champlin that the song was being  pulled off his album for inclusion on Earth, Wind & Fire's album - to which Champlin agreed to having the track removed. According to former manager turned Sony Music Entertainment CEO Tommy Mottola, Foster previously offered the song to Hall and Oates, but they rejected it, as they were not interested in singing songs written by anyone other than themselves.

Co-writer Graydon commented about the song's background:

Earth, Wind & Fire bassist Verdine White revealed that "After the Love Has Gone" was one of their most difficult songs to record:

"The track was based on a vibe. We cut it about six, seven times, and Maurice just said, "No, it's not right yet. We'll come back and get it tomorrow. It's not right yet". And then one day we nailed it, and it was right. The way it felt. It sounded like Earth, Wind & Fire".

Critical reception
The Guardian described After the Love Has Gone as "an exercise in classic songcraft – the horn section's precise jabs and the exquisite harmonies dazzle" Rose Riggins of Gannett wrote Maurice White's "talents are vividly expressed through 'Wait' and 'After The Love is Gone.' But he has yet to recapture the enchantment of the previous recording of 'Love's Holiday' off the All-n-All album." Matthew Greenwald of Allmusic proclaimed that a "simple soul-based melody and groove underlines the bittersweet goodbye message of the lyrics. But it's the arrangement that captured audience's attention, as it combined the group's vocal counterpoint harmony genius in full glory. A swinging saxophone in the song's middle-eight bridge also added an element of jazz". Allen Weiner of Morning Call found that "After The Love Is Gone is perhaps the best ballad EW&F has ever recorded. It's sensitive and warm, and interesting enough to justify its four-minute length." Ace Adams of the New York Daily News called After the Love Has Gone one of the album's "best songs".
Phyl Garland of Stereo Review noted that the song is "laced with unexpected Wonder-ful progressions".  Cash Box said it is an "easy, smooth ballad, with...lush horn and vocal arrangements," "superb harmonies and jazzy sax work."  Record World called it a "lovely ballad."

"After the Love Has Gone" was Grammy nominated for Record of the Year, Song of the Year and won in the category of Best R&B Vocal Performance by a Duo or Group.  The song also won a  Grammy in the category of Best R&B Song for Foster, Graydon and Champlin as its composers.  "After the Love Has Gone" has been placed on Bruce Pollock's list of The 7,500 Most Important Songs of 1944-2000.

Appearances in other media
The song was heard on an episode of WKRP in Cincinnati in a scene where staffer Bailey Quarters was brooding over being stood up on a planned date with morning drive DJ Johnny Fever.

The Houston Rockets played this song for losses, as would many other professional sports teams, including the Chicago White Sox, Philadelphia Phillies and Charlotte Hornets.

Covers and samples
The original recording of "After the Love Has Gone" by Airplay was released on their 1980 eponymous album following Earth, Wind & Fire's hit version. Stanley Turrentine also covered the song on his 1981 album Tender Togetherness.

During 1993, Jay Graydon released a version of the song on his solo album Airplay for the Planet. Phil Perry's rendition of the tune featuring Vesta appeared on his 1994 studio album Pure Pleasure. David Benoit and Russ Freeman also covered the song on their 1994 collaboration album, The Benoit/Freeman Project. Jazz Guitarist Norman Brown's rendition of the tune appeared on his 1996 album Better Days Ahead. 112 covered the tune on the 1998 album New York Undercover: A Night at Natalie's. Tommy Emmanuel and CDB released a version as the lead single from Emmanuel's 1998 album, Collaboration. The song peaked at number 74 in Australia.

UK boyband Damage covered the song on their 2001 album Since You've Been Gone, as well as Donny Osmond on his 2002 album Somewhere in Time.  Martes 8:30, a Latin jazz group, covered the song on their 2002 album Sinceramente; this version is noted for having a female lead vocal, as well as an extended sax solo by Ed Calle. Mint Condition's version appeared on their 2007 album Interpretations: Celebrating the Music of Earth, Wind & Fire. Kurt Elling covered this song on his 2011 LP The Gate. Eric Benet's rendition featured on his 2014 album From E to U: Volume 1.

Personnel
Writer, composer - David Foster, Jay Graydon, and Bill Champlin
Producer - Maurice White
Horn arrangement - Jerry Hey
String arrangement - David Foster
Alto Saxophone [Solo]           - Don Myrick

Engineers
Engineer - George Massenburg, Tom Perry
Mixing Engineer - George Massenburg
Assistant Engineer - Craig Widby, Ross Pallone

Chart performance

Weekly charts

Year-end charts

Certifications

References

1979 songs
1979 singles
1985 singles
1998 singles
Earth, Wind & Fire songs
CDB (band) songs
Damage (British band) songs
Songs written by David Foster
Songs written by Jay Graydon
Songs written by Bill Champlin
1970s ballads
Funk ballads
Rhythm and blues ballads
Columbia Records singles